Seal Cove Fault is a right lateral moving seismic fault located on the seabed just offshore of northern California, with some portions coming ashore right along the cliffs near Moss Beach in western San Mateo County. It is a major branch of the San Andreas Fault.

 
Seismic faults of California
Natural history of San Mateo County, California